Panayotis Potagos (Greek: Παναγιώτης Ποταγός; 1838 – 1903) was a Greek physician and explorer born in Vytina. Potagos began his travels in 1867, visiting Iraq, Iran, Afghanistan, Gobi Desert, and India.  He arrived in Egypt in 1876, ascending the Nile River to southern Sudan and then crossed the Congo-Nile Divide into the Congo River basin through what is now the Central African Republic and  finally reached the Uele River in 1877. He was the first European to reach the Mbomou and Uele rivers from the north. He published an account of his travels, which was translated into French.

He died in the village of Nymfes, Corfu.

References
Encyclopædia Britannica
A biographical dictionary of the Sudan by Richard Leslie Hill
Sur le voyage de M. Panagiotis Potagos en Asie centrale - 1880

External links
Dix années de voyages dans l'Asie centrale et l'Afrique équatoriale by  Papagiotis Potagos (1885) - Google Books

Greek explorers
Greek physicians
20th-century Greek physicians
19th-century Greek physicians
1903 deaths
1839 births
19th-century explorers
Explorers of Africa
Explorers of Asia
Explorers of Central Asia
People from Vytina